Fight Club was a two-day professional wrestling pay-per-view (PPV) event promoted by Game Changer Wrestling (GCW) that was held on October 8 and 9, 2022. Both nights of the event were held in Atlantic City, New Jersey; night 1 of the event took place at the Garden Pier at the Showboat while night 2 was held inside Showboat Hotel itself. The event aired on PPV via the FITE TV service.

The card comprised 18 matches which were divided evenly between the two nights. In the main event of night 1, Nick Gage defeated Jon Moxley in a Championship vs. Career match to win the GCW World Championship following interference from W. Morrissey and Stokely Hathaway, who were making their GCW debuts. In other prominent matches on night 1, the returning Lio Rush won a six-man scramble match, Drew Parker and Rina Yamashita defeated Alex Colon and Matt Tremont in a tag team death match, and Effy defeated the debuting Shota. In the main event of night 2, Rina Yamashita defeated Ciclope in a death match to retain the GCW Ultraviolent Championship. In other prominent matches on night 2, Joey Janela defeated Cole Radrick in a Title vs. Title match to retain the DDT Extreme Championship and win Radrick's GCW Extreme Championship, Drew Parker defeated Miedo Extremo in a death match to retain the King of Freedom World Championship, and Yamato defeated "Speedball" Mike Bailey.

Production

Background
On August 30, 2022, Game Changer Wrestling (GCW) announced that they would hold their annual Fight Club event on October 8 and 9 at the Showboat Hotel in Atlantic City, New Jersey. On October 4, GCW announced that night 1 of the event would move from inside the Showboat Hotel to the Garden Pier located outside the venue. The event was the sixth in GCW's Fight Club chronology. As part of Fight Club weekend, Jersey Championship Wrestling (JCW), GCW's developmental promotion, held their JCW vs. The World event.  

In addition to GCW wrestlers, wrestlers from All Elite Wrestling, Impact Wrestling, and Japanese promotions DDT Pro-Wrestling, Dragon Gate, and Pro Wrestling Freedoms were scheduled to appear at the event. The Lana Del Rey song "Ultraviolence" was featured in advertisements for the event.

Storylines
Fight Club featured 18 matches professional wrestling matches across the two nights, with different wrestlers involved in pre-existing scripted feuds, plots and storylines. Wrestlers portrayed either heels or faces as they engaged in a series of tension-building events, which culminated in a wrestling match.

The rivalry between Jon Moxley and Nick Gage dates back to the late 2000s during the two wrestlers' tenures in Combat Zone Wrestling (CZW); in their final encounter before Moxley signed with WWE, Moxley defeated Gage in a no ropes barbed wire match in October 2010 to retain the CZW World Heavyweight Championship. Eleven years later, on April 9, 2021, Moxley made a surprise return to GCW, confronting and attacking Gage after he had successfully retained the GCW World Championship at the promotion's rSpring Break event. On October 9, at Fight Club: Mox vs. Gage, Moxley, who had defeated Matt Cardona to win the GCW World Championship the previous month, defeated Gage in a death match to retain his championship. On August 13, 2022, at Homecoming Weekend, Gage challenged Moxley to rematch for the GCW World Championship, which Moxley said he would only grant if Gage agreed to risk his career in a Championship vs. Career match. Gage accepted the stipulation. The match was officially announced for Fight Club on August 30.

Results

Night 1

Night 2

See also
2022 in professional wrestling

References

2022 in professional wrestling
2022 in New Jersey
October 2022 events in the United States
Events in Atlantic City, New Jersey
Professional wrestling in New Jersey